The Kiamichi Railroad Company  is a Class III short-line railroad headquartered in Hugo, Oklahoma.

KRR operates two lines totaling  which intersect in Hugo, as well as maintaining trackage rights on an additional  of track.  The main line (186 miles) runs from Hope, Arkansas (where it interchanges with Union Pacific Railroad) to Lakeside, Oklahoma, then along 20 miles of BNSF Railway trackage rights to a BNSF interchange point at Madill, Oklahoma.  Along this line, KRR interchanges with Union Pacific at Durant, Oklahoma, with Kansas City Southern Railway at Ashdown, Arkansas, and with De Queen and Eastern Railroad via Texas, Oklahoma and Eastern Railroad at Valliant, Oklahoma.  Additionally, it interchanges with the shortline WFEC Railroad Company at Valliant, and is the Primary Operating Railroad on that line.

A 40-mile branch line runs from Antlers, Oklahoma to Paris, Texas.

The line was a former main line of the Frisco railway; KRR started operations in 1987.

KRR traffic generally consists of coal, lumber, paper, glass, cement, pulpwood, stone and food products. The KRR hauled around 53,000 carloads in 2008.

KRR was purchased by RailAmerica, a short-line railroad holding company, in 2002. Another holding company, Genesee & Wyoming Inc., purchased RailAmerica in late 2012.

References

External links

 Website

Arkansas railroads
Oklahoma railroads
Texas railroads
RailAmerica
Spin-offs of the Burlington Northern Railroad
Railway companies established in 1987
1987 establishments in the United States